Sir John Jennings (1664 – 23 December 1743) was a Royal Navy officer and Whig politician who sat in the English and British House of Commons between 1705 and 1734. He commanded HMS Kent at Cadiz and Vigo in 1702 during the War of the Spanish Succession. He went on to be Commander-in-Chief of the Jamaica Station, then Senior Naval Lord and finally Governor of Greenwich Hospital.

Early life
Jennings was the fifteenth child of Philip Jennings of Duddleston Hall, Shropshire and his wife Christian Eyton, daughter of Sir Gerard Eyton of Eyton, Shropshire. He was descended from a Shropshire family which had suffered for its adherence to the Royalist cause during the English Civil War. He married Alice Breton.

Naval career
Jennings was appointed a lieutenant on HMS Pearl in 1687, and served with the same rank in HMS St David and HMS Swallow, before being promoted to the command of the St Paul, a fireship. In 1690 he was made captain of the newly launched HMS Experiment, of 32 guns, and employed in cruising off the coast of Ireland, where he intercepted a number of small vessels which were being used as transports by James II's forces. In 1693, Jennings was nominated captain of the Victory, flagship of Sir John Ashby; later the same year he was transferred to the 62-gun HMS Mary, in which he went to the Mediterranean with Admiral Russell. In 1696, he was removed to the Chichester, of 80 guns; and, in the following year, was entrusted with the command of the Plymouth, with which he captured a St Malo privateer. Shortly afterwards, together with the frigate HMS Rye, he fell in with three French ships: one quickly surrendered, and Jennings, leaving the Rye to look after their prize, pursued the other two and succeeded in compelling one to strike her flag after a vigorous defence. Having conducted their prizes to port, the Rye and the Plymouth fell in with the Severn, a British man-of-war, and the three ships steered together for the coast of France, where they took five vessels laden with wine from Bordeaux, and a small ship of war.

On the outbreak of the War of the Spanish Succession, Jennings commanded HMS Kent (of 70 guns) under Admiral Rooke at Cadiz and Vigo in 1702, where he played a part in the destruction of the Franco-Spanish fleet. He took part in the capture of Gibraltar, and was captain of the 96-gun HMS St George at the Battle of Málaga in 1704. He was knighted for his exploits by Queen Anne on 9 September 1704, and having been promoted to rear admiral in 1705, became Commander-in-Chief of the Jamaica Station in 1706. He was promoted to vice admiral in 1708 and admiral in 1709. His attack on Tenerife in 1706 was unsuccessful. He commanded the fleet off Lisbon from 1708 to 1710, and was later Commander-in-Chief of the Mediterranean Fleet.

Parliamentary career
At the 1705 English general election, Jennings was returned as Whig Member of Parliament for Queenborough.  He was absent from the division on the choice of Speaker on 25 October 1705 and was absent on active service until the winter of 1707–8. Then in November he gave evidence to the Lords on the encouragement of trade in the West Indies and in January 1708 gave evidence on the bill for the encouragement of seamen. He also submitted a paper containing thirteen proposals to improve methods of manning the fleet, of which three were included in a Lords address to the Queen. He was returned again for Queenborough at the 1708 British general election. In parliament, he supported the naturalization of the Palatines in 1709 and voted for the impeachment of Dr Sacheverell in 1710. At the 1710 British general election, he was defeated at Queenborough, but was returned in the poll as MP for Portsmouth. However he was unseated on petition on 3 February 1711.

Jennings was returned as MP for Rochester on the Admiralty interest at the 1715 British general election. He voted with the Administration, except on the Peerage Bill which he opposed. He joined the Board of Admiralty under the Whig government in October 1714 but stood down when the Government fell in April 1717. He returned to the Admiralty Board under the Second Stanhope–Sunderland ministry in March 1718 In 1719 he was one of the original backers of the Royal Academy of Music, establishing a London opera company which commissioned numerous works from Handel and others.

He was also appointed governor of Greenwich Hospital and Ranger of Greenwich Park from 1720, and presented the marble statue of George II by Rysbrack which stands in the Grand Square of the hospital. in September 1721, he was advanced to Senior Naval Lord Also in 1721, he acquired Newsells Bury at Barkway in Hertfordshire. He was becoming deaf, but resigned from the Admiralty Board in June 1727 because he objected to serving under Lord Berkeley, the first Sea lord. He was returned again as MP for Rochester at the 1727 British general election. Although Berkeley was dismissed from the Admiralty board in 1727, Jennings was not keen to return, hoping instead for a promotion or peerage. He was promoted to rear-admiral of England in January 1733, but resigned a year later when Sir John Norris was made admiral of the fleet and commander in chief.

Death and legacy
Jennings died at Greenwich on 23 December 1743 at the age of 79, and was buried in Westminster Abbey. A separate monument exists at Barkway Parish Church sculpted by John Michael Rysbrack.

With his wife Alice, he had one son, George, who duly inherited Newsells.

References

Sources

Further reading
 Mark Noble, A Biographical history of England from the Revolution to the end of George I's Reign (London: W Richardson etc., 1806)
  The Georgian Era: Memoirs of the Most Eminent Persons... (London: Vizetelly, Branston & Co.,  1833)

External links
Portrait of Sir John Jennings by Kneller, from the National Maritime Museum collection

|-

|-

|-

|-

1664 births
1743 deaths
Lords of the Admiralty
Members of the Parliament of Great Britain for English constituencies
Burials at Westminster Abbey
British naval commanders in the War of the Spanish Succession
Royal Navy admirals
British MPs 1707–1708
British MPs 1708–1710
British MPs 1710–1713
British MPs 1715–1722
British MPs 1722–1727
British MPs 1727–1734
17th-century Royal Navy personnel
English MPs 1705–1707
Knights Bachelor